LGBT culture in Nashville consists of the LGBT friendliness, resources, communities, activities for the LGBT community in Nashville and the surrounding areas.

LGBT Friendliness
Each year, since 2012, The Human Rights Campaign rates cities based on five attributes that a city may or may not have, non-discrimination laws, the municipality as an employer, municipal services, law enforcement, and the city leadership's public position on LGBTQ equality. In 2019, they rated 506 cities, Nashville being one of them. Nashville scored higher than average (60 points out of 100), with 70 points out of 100. The city ranked the highest out of the eight cities that were ranked in Tennessee, which included Chattanooga, Clarksville, Franklin, Johnson City, Knoxville, Memphis, Murfreesboro, and Nashville.

LGBT Friendly Areas
As a result of the partnership between OkCupid and Trulia in 2017 cities across the United States were given a "Pride Score" that determined the most LGBT friendly communities on a point-based scale. The highest Pride Score in Nashville was given to zip code 37206, an area that largely consists of East Nashville.

Along with East Nashville, Church Street is commonly known as  "the center of gay life in Nashville." 2nd/4th Avenues are also considered LGBT friendly parts of Nashville.

LGBT Friendly Businesses

Cafe Coco
Cafe Coco is 24-hour LGBT friendly cafe that serves a varied menu, including coffee, beer, sandwiches, pizza, pasta, and desserts.

Canvas
Canvas is a small gay-friendly bar on Church Street that holds up to 85 people. The bar features a small menu and quirky decor accented by warm lighting.

D'Andrews Bakery & Cafe
D'Andrews is an LGBT-owned bakery and cafe certified by the National LGBT Chamber of Commerce. The bakery/cafe is known for their build-your-own salad bar and their house-made dressings.

Lipstick Lounge
Lipstick Lounge is a lesbian-owned, predominantly, lesbian/girl bar in East Nashville.

Suzy Wong's House of Yum
Suzy Wong's House of Yum is an Asian bar and restaurant that is known by the LGBT community for their drag shows during lunch and dinner. The owner of Suzy Wong's House of Yum is Top Chef contender Arnold Myint.

The Turnip Truck
The Turnip Truck is an LGBT-owned natural grocer certified by the LGBT Business Enterprise.

Resources

Vanderbilt LGBT Resources
 Vanderbilt University medical center offers a variety of services to members of the LGBT community. Their LGBT health services include HIV care, intersex health, mental health, and a Trans Buddy Program. The Trans Buddy Program offers transgender people the opportunity to have someone help them make important medical decisions and be there for them before, during, and/or after their transition.
 Vanderbilt offers many student groups for the attendees of the university. One of these, Out in Engineering, provides the opportunity for students to make connections with other members of the more niche community of LGBT engineers.
 On their website Vanderbilt provides resources for students and faculty/staff who are looking for LGBT friendly housing off-campus.

LGBT Friendly Media Outlets

HIV/AIDS Prevention and Care Services
 Nashville CARES
 Street-Works Outreach Program
 My House
 Vanderbilt Comprehensive Care Clinic

Communities

Certified LGBT Business Enterprises 
Nashville businesses whose owners are members the LGBT community have the opportunity to become certified with the National LGBT Chamber of Commerce through the local Nashville LGBT Chamber of Commerce.  According to the Chamber, Nashville's LGBTBEs are as follows:
 Abel McCallister & Abel
 BAM! Social Business
 Brandagement, LLC
 Brinnovate Digital Brand Marketing
 Clifton+Leopold
 D'Andrews Bakery & Cafe
 Diversity Builder, Inc.
 Dog and a Duck
 Doggie Doo's
 Force 1 Solutions
 Good Neighbor Festivals
 HelmsBriscoe
 Park Hill Realty Group
 MediCopy Services, Inc.
 Out & About Nashville
 Proudly Market
 Push the Marketing, LLC
 Ron Sanford Productions
 Schmidt Government Solutions
 Schooley Mitchell
 Social Link
 Southport Solutions
 STF Events & Catering, Inc.
 The Computer Butler, LLC
 The Turnip Truck
 TN Event Designs
 Tonda McKay Photography
 uBreakiFix
 Yuletide Office Solutions

Nashville in Harmony 
Nashville in Harmony is a diverse and inclusive choir.

Oasis Center
Oasis Center is a youth center. Their Just Us program focusses on supporting and advocating for LGBT youth in Nashville.

Nashville LGBT Gaymers
Nashville LGBT Gaymers is a Facebook community of LGBT gamers within the Nashville area.

LGBT-affirming religious institutions

Activities

Nashville Pride
Nashville Pride is an annual pride festival held on Broadway Street that includes a parade, vendors, and performances from music artists and other performers.

Nashville Black Pride
Nashville Black Pride hosts several annual pride events specifically for black members of the LGBT community, although all races and sexualities/orientations are welcome.

HotMess Sports
HotMess Sports is an LGBT sports league that plays a variety of sports such as dodgeball, kickball, and volleyball.

OutLoud Music Festival
OutLoud Music Festival is an annual LGBT music festival that includes LGBT artists in its lineup. Past performers include Kim Petras, Greyson Chance, and Gia Woods.

References 

LGBT culture in Tennessee
LGBT culture in the United States by city